Tekir may refer to:

 Erdinç Tekir (born 1966), Turkish member of the IHH 
 Tekir, located at the ancient settlement of Knidos
 Tekir ambarı, large cistern in Silifke district of Mersin Province, Turkey